The Solapur Municipal Corporation is the governing body of the city of Solapur in the Indian state of Maharashtra. The municipal corporation consists of democratically elected members, is headed by a mayor and administers the city's infrastructure, public services and police. Members from the state's leading various political parties hold elected offices in the corporation. Solapur municipal council is one of the oldest in India, founded in the 1860s and was given municipal corporation status in 1963.
Solapur municipal corporation is located in Solapur City.

List of Mayor

List of Deputy Mayor

Revenue sources 

The following are the Income sources for the corporation from the Central and State Government.

Revenue from taxes 
Following is the Tax related revenue for the corporation.

 Property tax.
 Profession tax.
 Entertainment tax.
 Grants from Central and State Government like Goods and Services Tax.
 Advertisement tax.

Revenue from non-tax sources 

Following is the Non Tax related revenue for the corporation.

 Water usage charges.
 Fees from Documentation services.
 Rent received from municipal property.
 Funds from municipal bonds.

Corporation Election 2017

Political Performance in Election 2017

References 

Solapur
Municipal corporations in Maharashtra
1963 establishments in Maharashtra